The commercial brewing of beer in Fiji only commenced in 1958 and the market is dominated by a single producer, Paradise Beverages (Fiji) Limited.

History
There was no alcohol in Fiji until the arrival of outsiders. Before this, yaqona (kava) was the traditional ceremonial drink used by men. In Fiji alcohol in various forms was introduced in the early 19th century by explorers, traders, whalers and to some extent missionaries. Missionaries of the London Missionary Society and the Methodist Church arrived in the 1830s.

During the Second World War, American soldiers introduced brewing and distillation with which the Fijian soldiers became familiarised.  Fiji became a British colony in 1874 and achieved independence in 1970. As in the other Pacific Islands, a permit system was set up to control alcohol accessibility. In Fiji, the permit system did not apply to Europeans, but only to Fijians and Indians. 

No permits were issued to women, either Indian or Fijian, or to young men (under the 25 years in the case of Indians, and under 30 years in the case of Fijians). In 1958 restrictions on access to beer were removed for adult males of any race and four years later, in 1962, adult males were allowed access to any alcoholic beverage. The restriction on the sale of alcohol to females was repealed in 1969.

Since 2014, consumption of beer per capita in Fiji has fallen by 0.9% on an annual basis. The peak consumption of  occurring in 1990. In 2019, the country was number 95 amongst all other countries in beer consumption per capita.

Since 2014 the amount of domestic beer produced has steadily increased 5.6% annually. In 2017 Fiji was ranked number 123 in domestic beer production in the world, producing . Fiji exported US$$302,620 worth of beer in 2019, a decrease of 2% from year to year, having peaked in 2017 at US$485,926. It was ranked at  116 in the world.

In Fiji homebrewing is becoming increasingly popular. The home-brews are generally stronger than the commercially produced beer, sometimes containing up to three times the alcohol content of commercially produced beer, and because they are made in secret little was known about how much home-brew is being produced in the country. In 1995 the unrecorded consumption of alcohol in Fiji was estimated to be  of pure alcohol per capita (15+).

Microbreweries
The country's first microbrewery, Island Brewing Company, commenced operations in 2009. In March 2014 it was acquired by Paradise Beverages. Currently  the country's only independent brewery is Kailoma Brewing Company, which was established in 2017. Their brewery currently produces three beers: Mokusiga Pacific Lager; Cloudies Summer Ale; and Bula Bitter Brew.

See also

Paradise Beverages
Samoa Breweries

External links
 Paradise Beverages official website
 Kailoma Brewing Company official website

References

Beer in Fiji
Economy of Fiji
History of Fiji